The 1989 NCAA Division II football season, part of college football in the United States organized by the National Collegiate Athletic Association at the Division II level, began in August 1989, and concluded with the NCAA Division II Football Championship on December 10, 1989, at Braly Municipal Stadium in Florence, Alabama, hosted by the University of North Alabama. The Mississippi College Choctaws defeated the Jacksonville State Gamecocks, 3–0, to win their first Division II national title. However, their championship was later revoked by the NCAA.

The Harlon Hill Trophy was awarded to  Johnny Bailey, running back from Texas A&I, for the third consecutive year.

Conference changes and new programs
One program departed Division II for Division I-AA prior to the season.

Conference standings

Conference summaries

Postseason

The 1989 NCAA Division II Football Championship playoffs were the 17th single-elimination tournament to determine the national champion of men's NCAA Division II college football. The championship game was held at Braly Municipal Stadium in Florence, Alabama, for the fourth time.

Playoff bracket

See also
1989 NCAA Division I-A football season
1989 NCAA Division I-AA football season
1989 NCAA Division III football season
1989 NAIA Division I football season
1989 NAIA Division II football season

References